Richard Coe Henders (July 6, 1853 – May 2, 1932) was a Canadian farmer, Methodist minister, and politician.

Born in Yelverton, Canada West, the son of Henry Henders and Frances Coe, Henders attended Bowmanville High School and Victoria University in Cobourg, Ontario. A Methodist minister for twenty years, he was a farmer in Winnipeg. He was President of the Manitoba Grain Growers' Association and Vice-President of the Canadian Council of Agriculture. He was elected to the House of Commons of Canada for Macdonald in 1917. A Unionist, he did not seek re-election in 1921.

He died in 1932 in Winnipeg.

References

External links
 

1853 births
1932 deaths
Canadian Methodist ministers
Members of the House of Commons of Canada from Manitoba
Unionist Party (Canada) MPs